Sardar Gian Singh Rarewala (16 December 1901 – 31 December 1979) was an Indian politician and the first Chief Minister (actually designated as the Prime Minister) of the former Indian state of Patiala and East Punjab States Union.

Early life
Rarewala was born on 16 December 1901, at Rara village, Patiala. He was a descendant of Ratan Singh Bhangu, author of Panth Prakash. Rarewala studied in Patiala and graduated from Mahindra College in 1924. He joined the judicial service of the princely state of Patiala. Later, he became a High Court judge for Patiala State. He also served as a Revenue Commissioner and Revenue Minister for Patiala state and finally he was the Prime Minister of Patiala state from 1946 to 1947.

Political career
Rarewala became a representative of Patiala in the Constituent Assembly of India on 28 April 1947. The Patiala and East Punjab States Union was formed later on 15 July 1948. A caretaker government was formed on 22 August 1948 with Rarewala as its Premier. On 13 January 1949 a broad-based ministry was constituted and Rarewala was sworn in as its Prime Minister. When this ministry was dissolved, Rarewala remained the premier of the caretaker ministry from 18 November 1949 to 23 May 1951.

In 1951, Rarewala was elected to the PEPSU Legislative Assembly from the constituency of Payal as an independent candidate. He became the Chief Minister of the PEPSU on 22 April 1952, heading a United Front ministry. Thus, he became the first non-Congress Chief Minister of any state in independent India. He was in office until 5 March 1953 when the President's rule was imposed and his government was dismissed. He became the president of the Shiromani Gurdwara Prabandhak Committee in 1955. After the merger of the PEPSU with the Punjab state in 1956, he became a member of the Indian National Congress and elected to the Punjab Legislative Assembly in 1957. Rarewala became the Irrigation Minister in the Pratap Singh Kairon Cabinet. He was re-elected to the Punjab Legislative Assembly in 1962 and 1967. In 1967 he was appointed leader of opposition in Punjab assembly.

On 14 December 1968, Rarewala left Congress and joined the Shiromani Akali Dal, probably because of his differences with Morarji Desai. He remained its member until his death.

References

1901 births
1979 deaths
Punjabi people
Shiromani Akali Dal politicians
Members of the Constituent Assembly of India
Punjab, India MLAs 1957–1962
Punjab, India MLAs 1962–1967
Punjab, India MLAs 1967–1972
Chief ministers from Shiromani Akali Dal
Indian National Congress politicians from Punjab, India